Petchpanomrung Kiatmookao (born May 26, 1995), also known as Petpanomrung Kiatmuu9 (เพชรพนมรุ้ง เกียรติหมู่เก้า), is a Thai Muay Thai kickboxer. Originally from Buriram, in the northeast of Thailand, Petpanomrung is from the same Muay Thai gym of the multiple time Lumpinee Stadium champion Singdam Kiatmuu9. He is the reigning Glory Featherweight (-65 kg)  and RISE Super Lightweight (-65 kg) World Champion.

As of January 2023, he is ranked as the #1 Super Featherweight (-67.5 kg) and #3 pound for pound kickboxer in the world by Beyond Kick and as the # 1 featherweight (-66 kg) and #9 pound for pound kickboxer by Combat Press. Combat Press has ranked him as a top featherweight since April 2017 and has briefly ranked him as the #7 pound for pound kickboxer in 2021.

Martial arts career

Glory

Early promotional career
Petpanomrung made his Glory debut against Stanislav Reniţă at Glory 35: Nice on November 5, 2016. He won the fight by unanimous decision, with all five judges awarding him all three rounds of the bout.

Petpanomrung took part in the 2017 Glory Featherweight Contender Tournament, which was held at Glory 39: Brussels on March 25, 2017. In the semifinals, he won a unanimous decision against Aleksei Ulianov. Petpanomrung captured the tournament title with a split decision win over Serhiy Adamchuk.

Winning the Contender Tournament earned Petpanomrung a chance to fight for the vacant Glory Featherweight Championship against the #1 ranked contender Robin van Roosmalen at Glory 41: Holland on May 20, 2017. van Roosmalen won the fight majority decision to capture the title. Petpanomrung was deducted a point in the third round for excessive clinching.

After losing his next fight to Rambo PetchPTT at the Lumpini Stadium, Petpanomrung returned to Glory to fight Xie Lei at Glory 46: China on October 14, 2017. He won the fight by unanimous decision.

Petpanomrung faced Zakaria Zouggary at Glory 49: Rotterdam on December 9, 2017. He won the fight by a third-round head kick knockout. Petpanomrung was deducted a point in the third round for excessive clinching.

Petpanomrung faced Abdellah Ezbiri at Glory 53: Lille on May 12, 2018. He won the fight by a second-round head kick knockout. The knockout was later named the 2018 Glory "Knockout of the Year".

Glory Featherweight champion
Petpanomrung was expected to challenge the reigning Glory Featherweight champion Robin van Roosmalen at Glory 55: New York on July 20, 2018. Roosmalen withdrew from the bout with an injury on July 6. Petpanomrung was rescheduled to face Kevin VanNostrand for the interim featherweight championship instead. He won the fight by split decision. Petpanomrung signed a new multi-year deal with Glory on March 26, 2019.

Petpanomrung was booked to unify the Glory Featherweight Championship with the full champion Robin van Roosmalen at Glory 59: Amsterdam on September 29, 2018. The pair previously fought a year prior, at Glory 41: Holland, with van Roosmalen winning a majority decision in their first encounter. Petpanomrung won the fight by unanimous decision, with all five judges awarding him every round of the bout.

Petpanomrung made his first title defense against the former Glory featherweight champion Serhiy Adamchuk at Glory 63: Houston on February 2, 2019, in a rematch of their Glory 39 fight, which Petpanomrung won by split decision. He was more convincing in their second meeting, as he won the fight by unanimous decision, with all five judges scoring the bout 50–45 in his favor.

Petpanomrung was expected to face Sergey Kulyaba at All Star Fight on March 9, 2019. He later withdrew and was replaced by Fonluang Sitboonmee. Petpanomrung made his second title defense against Anvar Boynazarov at Glory 67: Orlando on July 5, 2019. He won the fight by another dominant unanimous decision.

Petpanomrung was expected to make his third title defense against Aleksei Ulianov at Glory 72: Chicago on November 23, 2019. Ulianov withdrew from the bout on June 24, due to visa issues, and was replaced with Kevin VanNostrand. The rematch between the two ended in a majority decision draw.

Petpanomrung made his fourth title defense against Serhiy Adamchuk at Glory 75: Utrecht on February 29, 2020, whom he had faced and beaten on two previous occasions. He won their trilogy bout by unanimous decision, with all five judges scoring the fight 49–45 for Petpanomrung.

Glory & RISE champion
Petpanomrung was expected to face the former RISE Lightweight champion Kento Haraguchi at RISE El Dorado 2021, on February 21, 2021. He was later removed from the event as a result of being unable to Japan due to safety protocols imposed to combat the COVID-19 pandemic. The fight was re-scheduled for RISE World Series 2021 Osaka 2 on November 14, 2021. He won the fight by unanimous decision, with two judges awarding Petpanomrung a 30-28 scorecard, while the third judge scoring the fight 30-29 in his favor. Petpanomrung was shown a yellow card in the second round for excessive clinching. 

Petpanomrung faced Kento Haraguchi for the inaugural RISE World Super Lightweight Championship at RISE World Series Osaka 2022 on August 21, 2022. The fight was ruled a split decision draw after the first five rounds, with one judge scoring the bout 50–49 for Haraguchi, the second scoring it 49–48 for Petpanomrung and the third judge scoring it as an even 49–49 draw. Petpanomrung was awarded the unanimous decision, after an extra sixth round was contested.

Petpanomrung was booked to make his return to Glory to defend the Glory Featherweight Championship against the #5 ranked featherweight contender Abraham Vidales at Glory: Collision 4 on October 8, 2022. He retained the title by unanimous decision, with all but one judge awarding him all five rounds of the bout.

Petpanomrung faced the RISE Super Lightweight champion Kosei Yamada in a non-title bout at RISE World Series / Shootboxing-Kings on December 25, 2022. He won the fight by unanimous decision, with two scorecards of 30-29 and one scorecard of 30-28.

Petpanomrung moved up to lightweight to challenge the Glory Lightweight titleholder Tyjani Beztati at Glory 84 on March 11, 2023. He lost the fight by a fourth-round knockout.

Titles and accomplishments

Kickboxing
RISE
2022 RISE Super Lightweight (-65 kg) World Champion (one time; current) 

Glory
2018 Year in Review - Knockout of the Year
2018 Glory Featherweight (-65 kg) Champion (one time; Current) 
2018 interim Glory Featherweight (-65 kg) Champion 
2017 Glory Featherweight (-65 kg) Contender Tournament Winner

Muay Thai
World Muaythai Council
 2016 WMC World Lightweight Champion
Toyota Marathon 
 2015 Toyota Vigo Marathon Tournament Champion (64 Kg)
Professional Boxing Association of Thailand (PAT)
2013 Thailand (PAT) Super Featherweight (130 lbs) Champion (one defense)
 2011 Thailand (PAT) Bantamweight  (118 lbs) Champion
 Thailand (PAT) Mini-Flyweight (105 lbs) Champion

Fight record

|-  style="background:#fbb;"
| 2023-03-11 || Loss ||align=left| Tyjani Beztati || Glory 84 || Rotterdam, Netherlands || KO (Front kick) || 4 || 1:42
|-
! style=background:white colspan=9 |
|-  style="background:#cfc;"
| 2022-12-25|| Win ||align=left| Kosei Yamada  || RISE WORLD SERIES / Glory Rivals 4|| Tokyo, Japan || Decision (Unanimous) ||3  ||3:00
|- style="background:#cfc;"
| 2022-10-08 || Win || align="left" | Abraham Vidales || Glory: Collision 4 || Arnhem, Netherlands ||Decision (Unanimous)|| 5 || 3:00  
|-
!  style=background:white colspan=9 |
|-  style="background:#cfc;"
| 2022-08-21|| Win ||align=left| Kento Haraguchi || RISE WORLD SERIES OSAKA 2022 || Osaka, Japan ||  Ext.R Decision (Unanimous)|| 6 || 3:00  
|-
!  style=background:white colspan=9 |
|-  style="background:#fbb;"
| 2022-06-30|| Loss ||align=left| Chujaroen Dabransarakarm || Petchyindee, Rajadamnern Stadium || Bangkok, Thailand || Decision ||5  ||3:00  
|-  style="background:#fbb;"
| 2022-02-10|| Loss ||align=left| Chujaroen Dabransarakarm || Petchyindee, Rajadamnern Stadium || Bangkok, Thailand || Decision || 5 || 3:00 
|-  style="background:#cfc;"
| 2021-11-14|| Win ||align=left| Kento Haraguchi || RISE World Series 2021 Osaka 2 || Osaka, Japan || Decision (Unanimous)  || 3 ||3:00 
|-  style="background:#cfc;"
| 2021-10-15|| Win ||align=left| Chujaroen Dabransarakarm || True4U Muaymanwansuk || Buriram province, Thailand || Decision || 5 || 3:00
|-  style="background:#fbb;"
| 2021-04-09|| Loss ||align=left| Chujaroen Dabransarakarm || Petchyindee Road Show || Songkhla, Thailand || Decision || 5 || 3:00
|-  style="background:#cfc;"
| 2020-02-29 || Win ||align=left| Serhiy Adamchuk || Glory 75: Utrecht || Utrecht, Netherlands || Decision (Unanimous) || 5 || 3:00 
|-
!  style=background:white colspan=9 |
|-  style="background:#c5d2ea"
| 2019-11-23 || Draw||align=left| Kevin VanNostrand || Glory 72: Chicago  || Chicago, United States || Decision || 5 ||  3:00
|-
!  style=background:white colspan=9 |
|-  style="background:#cfc;"
| 2019-07-05 || Win ||align=left| Anvar Boynazarov || Glory 67: Orlando || Orlando, United States || Decision (Unanimous) || 5 || 3:00 
|-
!  style=background:white colspan=9 |
|-  style="background:#cfc;"
| 2019-02-02 || Win ||align=left| Serhiy Adamchuk || Glory 63: Houston || Houston, United States || Decision (Unanimous) || 5 || 3:00 
|-
!  style=background:white colspan=9 |
|-  style="background:#CCFFCC"
| 2018-09-29 || Win||align=left| Robin van Roosmalen || Glory 59: Amsterdam  || Amsterdam, Netherlands || Decision (Unanimous) || 5 ||  3:00
|-
! style=background:white colspan=9 | 
|-  style="background:#CCFFCC"
| 2018-07-20 || Win||align=left| Kevin VanNostrand || Glory 55: New York  || New York City, New York || Decision (Split) || 5 ||  3:00
|-
! style=background:white colspan=9 | 
|- style="background:#cfc;"
|-  style="background:#CCFFCC"
| 2018-05-12 || Win||align=left| Abdellah Ezbiri || Glory 53: Lille  || Lille, France || KO (Left High Kick) || 2 ||  1:40
|-  style="background:#CCFFCC"
| 2017-12-09 || Win ||align=left| Zakaria Zouggary || Glory 49: Rotterdam  || Rotterdam, Netherlands || KO (Head Kick) || 3 || 2:10
|- style="background:#cfc;"
| 2017-10-14 || Win ||align=left| Xie Lei ||  Glory 46: China || Guangzhou, China || Decision (Unanimous) || 3 || 3:00
|-  style="background:#fbb;"
| 2017-08-08 || Loss ||align=left|  Rambo PetchPTT || Lumpinee Stadium || Bangkok, Thailand || TKO || 3 ||
|-  style="background:#fbb;"
| 2017-05-20 || Loss ||align=left| Robin van Roosmalen || Glory 41: Holland || Den Bosch, Netherlands || Decision (majority) || 5 || 3:00 
|-
! style=background:white colspan=9 | 
|- style="background:#cfc;"
| 2017-03-25 || Win ||align=left| Serhiy Adamchuk || Glory 39: Brussels - Featherweight Contender Tournament, Final || Brussels, Belgium || Decision (Split) || 3 || 3:00
|-
! style=background:white colspan=9 |
|- style="background:#cfc;"
| 2017-03-25 || Win ||align=left| Aleksei Ulianov || Glory 39: Brussels - Featherweight Contender Tournament, Semi Finals || Brussels, Belgium || Decision (Unanimous) || 3 || 3:00
|-  style="background:#fbb;"
| 2017-01-13 || Loss ||align=left| Wei Rui || Glory of Heroes 6 || Jiyuan, China || Ext. R Decision (Unanimous) || 4 || 3:00
|-  style="background:#fbb;"
| 2016-12-24 || Loss ||align=left| Thaksinlek Kiatniwat || Yodmuay Thairath TV || Bangkok, Thailand || Decision || 5 || 3:00
|-  style="background:#CCFFCC;"
| 2016-11-24 || Win ||align=left| Kongsak Saenchaimuaythaigym || Bangrajan Fight, Rajadamnern Stadium || Bangkok, Thailand || Decision || 5 || 3:00
|-  style="background:#CCFFCC;"
| 2016-11-05|| Win||align=left| Stanislav Reniţă || Glory 35: Nice || Nice, France || Decision (Unanimous) || 3 || 3:00
|-  style="background:#fbb;"
| 2016-09-30 || Loss ||align=left|  Muangthai PKSaenchaimuaythaigym ||  Suek PKSaenchai Fight, Lumpinee Stadium || Bangkok, Thailand || KO (Elbow) || 2 || 1:22
|-  style="background:#fbb;"
| 2016-06-10 || Loss ||align=left| Chamuaktong Fightermuaythai ||  Wanweraphon Fight, Lumpinee Stadium || Bangkok, Thailand || Decision || 5 || 3:00
|-
! style=background:white colspan=9 |
|-  style="background:#CCFFCC;"
| 2016-05-09 || Win||align=left| Phetmorakot Wor Sangprapai || Wanmitchai Fights, Rajadamnern Stadium || Bangkok, Thailand || Decision || 5 || 3:00
|-
! style=background:white colspan=9 |
|-  style="background:#CCFFCC;"
| 2016-04-07 || Win||align=left|  Chamuaktong Fightermuaythai || Petwiset Fights, Rajadamnern Stadium || Bangkok, Thailand || Decision || 5 || 3:00
|-  style="background:#CCFFCC;"
| 2016-03-07 || Win||align=left| Phetmorakot Wor Sangprapai || Wangingthong Fights, Rajadamnern Stadium || Bangkok, Thailand || Decision || 5 || 3:00
|-  style="background:#fbb;"
| 2015-12-25 || Loss||align=left| Phetmorakot Wor Sangprapai || Toyota Vigo Marathon Tournament 2015, Final || Chon Buri, Thailand || Decision || 3 || 3:00
|-
!  style=background:white colspan=9 |
|-  style="background:#CCFFCC;"
| 2015-12-25 || Win||align=left| Manaowan Sitsongpeenong || Toyota Vigo Marathon Tournament 2015, Semi Final || Chon Buri, Thailand || Decision || 3 || 3:00
|-  style="background:#CCFFCC;"
| 2015-10-30 || Win||align=left|  Kwankhao Mor.Ratanabandit  || Toyota Vigo Marathon Tournament 2015, Final ||  Thailand || Decision || 3 || 3:00
|-
!  style=background:white colspan=9 |
|-  style="background:#CCFFCC;"
| 2015-10-30 || Win||align=left|  Aranchai Kiatphataraphan  || Toyota Vigo Marathon Tournament 2015, Semi Final ||  Thailand || Decision || 3 || 3:00
|-  style="background:#CCFFCC;"
| 2015-10-30 || Win||align=left|  Hector Tournier  || Toyota Vigo Marathon Tournament 2015, Quarter Final || Bangkok, Thailand || KO (Punch) || 1 ||
|-  style="background:#fbb;"
| 2015-09-20|| Loss ||align=left| Yodthunthong Petchyindee Academy || Asawindum Spring News || Bangkok, Thailand || Decision ||5  ||3:00  
|-  style="background:#fbb;"
| 2015-07-10 || Loss||align=left| Kwankhao Mor.Ratanabandit   ||  Wanweraphon Fight, Lumpinee Stadium || Bangkok, Thailand || Decision || 5 || 3:00
|-  style="background:#CCFFCC;"
| 2015-06-11 || Win||align=left|  Aranchai Kiatphataraphan  || Wangingtong Fight, Rajadamnern Stadium || Bangkok, Thailand || Decision || 5 || 3:00
|-  style="background:#CCFFCC;"
| 2015-04-02 || Win||align=left| Kwankhao Mor.Ratanabandit  || Wanmitchai + Petchviset Fight, Rajadamnern Stadium || Bangkok, Thailand || Decision || 5 || 3:00
|-  style="background:#CCFFCC;"
| 2015-01-25 || Win||align=left|  Aranchai Kiatphataraphan  || Chalong Boxing Stadium || Phuket, Thailand || Decision || 5 || 3:00
|-  style="background:#fbb;"
| 2014-06-11 || Loss ||align=left| Phetmorakot Wor Sangprapai ||  Petchviset Fight, Rajadamnern Stadium || Bangkok, Thailand || Decision || 5 || 3:00
|-  style="background:#c5d2ea;"
| 2014-05-06 || Draw ||align=left| Yodtuantong Petchyindeeacade || Suek Petchpiya Fight, Lumpinee Stadium  || Songkla, Thailand || Decision || 5 || 3:00
|-  style="background:#fbb;"
| 2014-04-04 || Loss ||align=left| Phetmorakot Wor Sangprapai || Petyindee and Onesongchai Promotions || Songkla, Thailand || Decision || 5 || 3:00
|-  style="background:#CCFFCC;"
| 2014-02-28 || Win||align=left| Singtongnoi Por.Telakun || Lumpinee Champion Krikkrai Fight, Lumpinee Stadium  || Bangkok, Thailand || Decision || 5 || 3:00 
|-
! style=background:white colspan=9 |
|-  style="background:#fbb;"
| 2014-01-21 || Loss ||align=left| Nong-O Kaiyanghadaogym || Praianunt Fight, Lumpinee Stadium || Bangkok, Thailand || Decision || 5 || 33:00
|-  style="background:#CCFFCC;"
| 2013-12-03 || Win||align=left| Yodtuantong Petchyindeeacademy   || Lumpinee Stadium || Bangkok, Thailand || Decision || 5 || 33:00
|-  style="background:#fbb;"
| 2013-10-08 || Loss ||align=left| Pakorn PKSaenchaimuaythaigym    || Lumpinee Stadium || Bangkok, Thailand || Decision || 5 || 3:00
|-  style="background:#CCFFCC;"
| 2013-09-04 || Win||align=left| Phetmorakot Wor Sangprapai   || Rajadamnern Stadium || Bangkok, Thailand || Decision || 5 || 3:00
|-  style="background:#CCFFCC;"
| 2013-07-12 || Win||align=left| Kaimukkao Por.Thairongruangkamai    || Lumpinee Stadium || Bangkok, Thailand || Decision || 5 || 3:00
|-
!  style=background:white colspan=9 |

|-  style="background:#fbb;"
| 2013-06-07 || Loss ||align=left| Kongsak Saenchaimuaythaigym    || Lumpinee Stadium || Bangkok, Thailand || Decision || 5 || 3:00
|-
!  style=background:white colspan=9 |

|-  style="background:#CCFFCC;"
| 2013-05-10 || Win||align=left| Saeksan Or. Kwanmuang   || Lumpinee Stadium || Bangkok, Thailand || Decision || 5 || 3:00
|-  style="background:#CCFFCC;"
| 2013-01-04 || Win||align=left| Sam-A Kaiyanghadaogym   || Lumpinee Stadium || Bangkok, Thailand || Decision || 5 || 3:00
|-  style="background:#fbb;"
| 2012-12-07 || Loss ||align=left| Penake Sitnumnoi    || Lumpinee Stadium || Bangkok, Thailand || Decision || 5 || 3:00
|-
!  style=background:white colspan=9 |

|-  style="background:#fbb;"
| 2012-11-02 || Loss||align=left| Sam-A Kaiyanghadaogym  || Lumpinee Stadium || Bangkok, Thailand || Decision || 5 || 3:00
|-  style="background:#fbb;"
| 2012-10-04 || Loss ||align=left| Pokaew Fonjangchonburi  || Wanmitchai Fights, Rajadamnern Stadium || Bangkok, Thailand || Decision || 5 || 3:00
|-  style="background:#CCFFCC;"
| 2012-09-11 || Win||align=left| Yodkhunpon Sitmonchai  || Petchpiya Fights, Lumpinee Stadium || Bangkok, Thailand || Decision || 5 || 3:00
|-  style="background:#CCFFCC;"
| 2012-07-31 || Win||align=left| Ritidej Wor.Wanthavi || Superfight Pumpanmuang Fights, Lumpinee Stadium || Bangkok, Thailand || Decision || 5 || 3:00
|-  style="background:#fbb;"
| 2012-07-06 || Loss ||align=left| Pokaew Fonjangchonburi || Suekpetchpiya Fights, Lumpinee Stadium || Bangkok, Thailand || Decision || 5 || 3:00
|-  style="background:#CCFFCC;"
| 2012-06-08 || Win ||align=left| Tingtong Chor Koiyuhaisuzu || Suek Ramnumjaiwongkarnmuay Fights, Lumpinee Stadium || Bangkok, Thailand || Decision || 5 || 3:00
|-  style="background:#CCFFCC;"
| 2012-05-04 || Win ||align=left| Palangtip Nor.Sripueng || Lumpinee Champion Krikkrai Fights, Lumpinee Stadium || Bangkok, Thailand || Decision || 5 || 3:00
|-  style="background:#fbb;"
| 2012-04-03 || Loss||align=left| Tong Puideenaidee  || Suekpetchyindee Fights, Lumpinee Stadium || Bangkok, Thailand || Decision || 5 || 3:00
|-  style="background:#fbb;"
| 2012-03-02 || Loss||align=left| Sam-A Kaiyanghadaogym  || Suek Sangsawangpunpa Fights, Lumpinee Stadium || Bangkok, Thailand || Decision || 5 || 3:00
|-  style="background:#CCFFCC;"
| 2012-02-03 || Win ||align=left| Thong Puideenaidee || Petchpiya Fights, Lumpinee Stadium || Bangkok, Thailand || KO (head kick) || 3 ||
|-  style="background:#CCFFCC;"
| 2011-12-09 || Win ||align=left| Ponsawan Lookprabaht  || Lumpinee Champion Krikkrai Fights, Rajadamnern Stadium || Bangkok, Thailand || Decision || 5 || 3:00
|-  style="background:#CCFFCC;"
| 2011-11-09 || Win ||align=left| Thongchai Sitsongpeenong  || Daprungprabaht Fights, Rajadamnern Stadium || Bangkok, Thailand || Decision || 5 || 3:00
|-  style="background:#CCFFCC;"
| 2011-09-22 || Win ||align=left| Kaotam Lookprabaht  || Daprungprabaht Fights, Rajadamnern Stadium || Bangkok, Thailand || Decision || 5 || 3:00
|-  style="background:#fbb;"
| 2011-07-29 || Loss||align=left| Ponsawan Lookprabaht || Phetsupaphan Fights, Lumpinee Stadium || Bangkok, Thailand || Decision || 5 || 3:00
|-  style="background:#CCFFCC;"
| 2011-06-10 || Win||align=left| Kungwanlek Petchyindee || Lumpinee Champion Krikkrai Fights, Lumpinee Stadium || Bangkok, Thailand || Decision || 5 || 3:00
|-
!  style=background:white colspan=9 |
|-  style="background:#fbb;"
| 2011-04-29 || Loss||align=left| Nongbeer Chokngamwong || Phetsupaphan Fights, Lumpinee Stadium || Bangkok, Thailand || Decision || 5 || 3:00
|-  style="background:#CCFFCC;"
| 2011-02-15 || Win||align=left| Nuangthep Eminentair || Petchyindee Fights, Lumpinee Stadium || Bangkok, Thailand || Decision || 5 || 3:00
|-  style="background:#fbb;"
| 2010-06-04 || Loss||align=left| Mondam Sor.Werapon || Lumpinee Champion Krikkrai Fights, Lumpinee Stadium || Bangkok, Thailand || Decision
|| 5 || 3:00
|-  style="background:#CCFFCC;"
| 2010-04-06 || Win||align=left| Prajanchai P.K.Saenchaimuaythaigym || Petchyindee Fights, Lumpinee Stadium || Bangkok, Thailand || Decision || 5 || 3:00
|-  style="background:#CCFFCC;"
| 2010-03-11 || Win||align=left| Karn Kor.Kumpanart || Onesongchai Fights, Lumpinee Stadium || Bangkok, Thailand || Decision || 5 || 3:00
|-  style="background:#fbb;"
| 2010-02-09 || Loss||align=left| Mondam Sor.Werapon || Wanwerapon Fight, Lumpinee Stadium || Bangkok, Thailand || Decision || 5 || 3:00
|-  style="background:#fbb;"
| 2010-01-15 || Loss||align=left| Porha Excidicalgym || Petsupapan Fight, Lumpinee Stadium || Bangkok, Thailand || Decision || 5 || 3:00
|-  style="background:#CCFFCC;"
| 2009-12-22 || Win||align=left| Petchernchom Sor.Tayang || Petchyindee Fights, Lumpinee Stadium || Bangkok, Thailand || Decision || 5 || 3:00
|-  style="background:#CCFFCC;"
| 2009-10-09 || Win||align=left| Siangpraiwan Teded99 || Petchyindee Fights, Lumpinee Stadium || Bangkok, Thailand || Decision || 5 || 3:00
|-  style="background:#CCFFCC;"
| 2009-04-25 || Win||align=left| Newpetdam Sor.Kattika || Krikkrai Fights, Lumpinee Stadium || Bangkok, Thailand || Decision || 5 || 3:00
|-  style="background:#CCFFCC;"
| 2009-01-06 || Win||align=left| Jaroentong Petsirigym || Petchyindee Fights, Lumpinee Stadium || Bangkok, Thailand || Decision || 5 || 3:00
|-
| colspan=9 | Legend:

See also
 List of male kickboxers

References

External links
Glory profile

Petpanomrung Kiatmuu9
Living people
1995 births
Petpanomrung Kiatmuu9
Featherweight kickboxers
Petpanomrung Kiatmuu9
Glory kickboxers